Takemitsu Takizaki (born 10 June 1945) is a Japanese billionaire businessman, honorary chairman and founder of Keyence, a Japanese manufacturer of automation sensors, vision systems, barcode readers, laser markers, measuring instruments, and digital microscopes.

Early life
Takemitsu Takizaki was born on 10 June 1945. He was educated at Amagasaki Industry High School.

Career
Takizaki founded Keyence in 1974 and stepped down as chairman in 2015, remaining on the board of directors and as an honorary chairman.

According to CEOWORLD magazine, as of September 22, 2022, Takizaki has a net worth of $18.6 billion.

Personal life
Takizaki is married, with one child, a son, Takeshi Takizaki, and lives in Osaka, Japan. He is a keen fossil collector.

References 

1945 births
Living people
Japanese billionaires
20th-century Japanese businesspeople
21st-century Japanese businesspeople